ISTA Pharmaceuticals, Inc, was a US-based pharmaceutical company that  specialized in ophthalmic pharmaceutical  products and discovers, develops, and markets therapies for inflammation, ocular pain, glaucoma, allergy, and dry eye. ISTA was acquired by Bausch & Lomb, an eye care company, on March 26, 2012. Under the deal, Bausch & Lomb have agreed to pay $9.10 per share for ISTA, bringing the total value of the acquisition to $500 million.

In 2012, Valeant Pharmaceuticals withdrew its $360 million offer.

Products
 Bromday (bromfenac ophthalmic solution) 0.09% for the treatment of postoperative inflammation and reduction of ocular pain in patients who have undergone cataract extraction
 Bepreve (bepotastine besilate ophthalmic solution) 1.5% for the treatment of itching associated with signs and symptoms of allergic conjunctivitis
 Xibrom (bromfenac ophthalmic solution) 0.09% for the treatment of inflammation and pain following cataract surgery (no longer being manufactured as of February 2011)
 Istalol (timolol maleate ophthalmic solution) 0.5% for the treatment of elevated intraocular pressure in patients with ocular hypertension or open-angle glaucoma
 Vitrase (hyaluronidase injection) Ovine, 200 USP units/mL for use as an adjuvant to increase the absorption and dispersion of other injected drugs; for hypodermoclysis; and as an adjunct in subcutaneous urography for improving resorption of radiopaque agents

Litigation
On May 24, 2013, ISTA Pharmaceuticals entered a guilty plea to federal felony charge of conspiracy to introduce a misbranded drug into interstate commerce and conspiracy to pay illegal remuneration in violation of the Federal Anti-Kickback Statute. ISTA agreed to pay $33.5 million to resolve criminal and civil liability arising from its marketing, distribution and sale of its drug Xibrom.

References

External links

ISTA homepage

Companies based in Irvine, California
American companies established in 1992
Pharmaceutical companies established in 1992
Pharmaceutical companies of the United States
Companies formerly listed on the Nasdaq
Health care companies based in California